

Executive Departments
The following State of Maryland executive departments are headquartered in Baltimore:

Maryland Department of Transportation
Although the Maryland Department of Transportation is headquartered in Anne Arundel County, three of its subordinate organizations have headquarters located in Baltimore.

Independent state agencies and commissions
The following independent state agencies and commissions have headquarters located in Baltimore.

Baltimore-related lists
Maryland-related lists